The Thailand–Burma Railway Centre is a museum and research centre in Kanchanaburi, Thailand. It is privately funded and is run by Rod Beattie, an Australian who is an expert in the history of the Thailand–Burma Railway. The centre is located to the west of the Kanchanaburi War Cemetery, and is housed in the former headquarters of the Imperial Japanese Army which was constructed by prisoners of war and Asian forced labourers.

See also
 Kanchanaburi War Cemetery
 JEATH War Museum

References

External links

The Thailand-Burma Railway Centre - Official website
 Webpage about the Centre

Burma Railway
Kanchanaburi
World War II museums
Military history of Thailand
Museums established in 2003
History museums in Thailand
Military and war museums in Thailand
Buildings and structures in Kanchanaburi province
Tourist attractions in Kanchanaburi province
2003 establishments in Thailand